František Metelka (born 8 April 1980 in Vítkov) is a former Czech football player.

Career
Metelka played for Silesian clubs SFC Opava and Baník Ostrava before moving to Slovenia to play for Rudar Velenje. He won the Czech Cup with Baník in 2005.

In February 2011, he joined Podbeskidzie Bielsko-Biała on a one-year contract.

In July 2016 he returned to Opava as a playing assistant manager for Opava's reserve team.

References

External links

1980 births
Living people
People from Vítkov
Czech footballers
Association football midfielders
Czech First League players
SFC Opava players
FC Baník Ostrava players
FK Baník Sokolov players
NK Rudar Velenje players
Expatriate footballers in Slovenia
Czech expatriate sportspeople in Slovenia
Podbeskidzie Bielsko-Biała players
Ekstraklasa players
Expatriate footballers in Poland
Czech expatriate sportspeople in Poland
Czech expatriate footballers
Sportspeople from the Moravian-Silesian Region